North Korea–Yugoslavia relations were historical foreign relations between North Korea and now broken up Yugoslavia. The Socialist Federal Republic of Yugoslavia and the Democratic People's Republic of Korea established diplomatic relations on 30 October 1948. During the initial period of the Korean conflict, motivated by the recent Tito-Stalin split and contrary to other countries in Eastern Europe, Yugoslavia remained firmly not aligned to any of the blocs in the Korean War. Yugoslavian literature compared attack on South Korea by North Korea as similar to the attack on Yugoslavia by the German Army and the attack on Hawaii by the Japanese army while Yugoslav representation at the United Nations even accused the Soviet Union of having started the Korean War.

Relations were very close during the time of Josip Broz Tito and Kim Il-sung. Both leaders had taken a neutral stance during the Sino-Soviet split and maintained friendly relations with both the Soviet Union and China. Yugoslavia and North Korea were members of the Non-Aligned Movement with Yugoslavia being one of the movement's founding members.

Bilateral agreements 
25 May 1971: agreement on trade and payments.
4 September 1973: agreement on the abolition of visas between the two countries.
4 November 1974: agreement on cultural cooperation.
22 February 1975: agreement on the setting up of a consultative commission for economic and scientific-technical cooperation.
6 November 1975: agreement on air services.
11 December 1975: agreement on cooperation in telecommunications.
20 February 1978: agreement on cooperation in the fields of health, medical science and pharmaceuticals.
20 September 1978: agreement on providing health services free of charge to the diplomatic personnel and members of their families on a reciprocal basis.
4 March 1982: agreement on the mutual abolition of visas between the SFRY and the DPR of Korea for citizens of the two countries holding ordinary passports when travelling on business.

References

See also 
 Foreign relations of North Korea
 Foreign relations of Yugoslavia

North Korea
Yugoslavia
Croatia–North Korea relations
North Korea–Serbia relations